Baguer-Morvan (Gallo: Bayér-Morvan) is a commune in the Ille-et-Vilaine department in Brittany in northwestern France.

Population

Inhabitants of Baguer-Morvan are called Baguerrois in French.

See also
Communes of the Ille-et-Vilaine department

References

External links

Official website 
Mayors of Ille-et-Vilaine Association  

Communes of Ille-et-Vilaine